The 1975 European Figure Skating Championships was a senior-level international competition held in Copenhagen, Denmark from January 28 to February 2. Elite senior-level figure skaters from European ISU member nations competed for the title of European Champion in the disciplines of men's singles, ladies' singles, pair skating, and ice dancing.

Results

Men

Ladies

Pairs

Ice dancing

References

External links
 results

European Figure Skating Championships, 1975
European Figure Skating Championships, 1975
European Figure Skating Championships
Figure skating in Denmark
International sports competitions in Copenhagen
1970s in Copenhagen
European Figure Skating
European Figure Skating